The Olympic mascots are fictional characters, usually an animal native to the area or human figures, who represent the cultural heritage of the place where the Olympic and Paralympic Games are taking place. Ever since the 1932 Summer Olympics in Los Angeles, California, the Olympic Games have always had a mascot. The first major mascot in the Summer Olympic Games was Misha in the 1980 Summer Olympics in Moscow. Starting with the 2010 Vancouver mascots (since 1992), the Olympic and Paralympic mascots have been presented together.

History
The first Olympic mascot was born at the Grenoble Olympic Games in 1968. It was named "Schuss" and it was a little man on skis, designed in an abstract form and painted in the colors of France: blue, red and white. However, the first official Olympic mascot appeared in the 1972 Summer Olympics in Munich. It was Waldi, a Dachshund dog, a popular breed in Bavaria and it represented the attributes required for athletes – resistance, tenacity and agility. On it were three of the colors of the Olympic flag (blue, yellow, green).

The success of those first mascots helped the idea of a mascot become a symbol of the Olympic Games and developed into an institution. Mascots are very popular and despite the importance of the message they convey, they are designed in a simple manner with bright, happy colors appropriate for the 'festive' atmosphere of the Olympic Games.

Olympic mascots

Youth Olympic mascots

See also
 Olympic symbols
 Paralympic mascots
 Paralympic symbols

References
Notes

External links
 Official site of the Olympic Movement – Images and information on every game since 1896
 OlympicHistory.info: Mascots 
 Canadian Olympic Mascots 1976 – 2010

 
Mas
Olympic